Radziechowy  is a village in the administrative district of Gmina Radziechowy-Wieprz, within Żywiec County, Silesian Voivodeship, in southern Poland. The village has a population of approximately 5,000.

It is one of the oldest villages in Żywiec Basin. It was established in the first half of the 14th century.

Landmarks 
 St. Martin's Church (from the 16th century)
 Golgotha of the Beskids (Polish: Golgota Beskidów) - Way of the Cross

References

Radziechowy